The 2022 Just World Indoor Bowls Championship took place at Potters Leisure Resort, Hopton-on-Sea, Great Yarmouth, England, from 7–23 January 2022. The event is organised by the World Bowls Tour, and will be televised by the BBC and streamed live on YouTube.

The Open Singles was won by the sixth seed Les Gillett who overcame five times champion Paul Foster. Gillett won the first set    by virtue of overtaking Foster's lead during the final ends. Foster comfortably won the second set before Gillett won the tie break.

Katherine Rednall won a record breaking fourth women's singles title.

In the open pairs Stewart Anderson and Darren Burnett defeated defending champions Mark Dawes and Jamie Chestney to win their second title together. Paul Foster and Alison Merrien won the mixed pairs title.

The continued issues with COVID-19 pandemic caused several problems; South African Thinus Olefse and Israel's Noam Yehudai had to pull out of the Open Singles before the tournament began due to travel restrictions, so their places in the draw were taken by England's Scott Edwards and Scotland's John McCrorie respectively. In the Women's World Matchplay, South Africa's Gillian Young was replaced by Wales's Kerry Packwood, while in the Open Pairs, Israeli duo Beverly Polatinsky and Boaz Markus had to withdraw. On the eve of the tournament, USA's Loren Dion and England's William Moulton tested positive for Covid-19, so had to pull out of the Open Pairs and were replaced by Scott Edwards and Wayne Willgress respectively.

Winners

Draw and results

Open singles

Women's singles

Open pairs

Mixed pairs

Open Under 25

References

World Indoor Bowls Championship
2022 in bowls
World Indoor Bowls Championship
International sports competitions hosted by England
World Indoor Bowls Championship
Sport in Great Yarmouth
World Indoor Bowls